Jason Morrison may refer to:

 Jason Morrison (radio broadcaster) (born 1971), Australian talk radio announcer
 Jason Morrison (footballer) (born 1984), Jamaican footballer